8th Online Film Critics Society Awards
January 10, 2005

Best Picture
Eternal Sunshine of the Spotless Mind
The 8th Online Film Critics Society Awards, honoring the best in filmmaking in 2004, were given on 10 January 2005.

Winners and nominees

Best Picture
Eternal Sunshine of the Spotless Mind
Before Sunset
Garden State
The Incredibles
Sideways

Best Director
Michel Gondry – Eternal Sunshine of the Spotless Mind 
Clint Eastwood – Million Dollar Baby
Alexander Payne – Sideways
Martin Scorsese – The Aviator
Zhang Yimou – Hero

Best Actor
Paul Giamatti – Sideways 
Jim Carrey – Eternal Sunshine of the Spotless Mind
Don Cheadle – Hotel Rwanda
Leonardo DiCaprio – The Aviator
Jamie Foxx – Ray

Best Actress
Kate Winslet – Eternal Sunshine of the Spotless Mind 
Julie Delpy – Before Sunset
Imelda Staunton – Vera Drake
Hilary Swank – Million Dollar Baby
Uma Thurman – Kill Bill: Volume 2

Best Supporting Actor
Thomas Haden Church – Sideways 
David Carradine – Kill Bill: Volume 2
Jamie Foxx – Collateral
Clive Owen – Closer
Peter Sarsgaard – Kinsey

Best Supporting Actress
Cate Blanchett – The Aviator
Laura Linney – Kinsey
Virginia Madsen – Sideways
Natalie Portman – Closer
Sharon Warren – Ray

Best Original Screenplay
Eternal Sunshine of the Spotless Mind – Charlie KaufmanGarden State – Zach Braff
The Incredibles – Brad Bird
Kill Bill: Volume 2 – Quentin Tarantino
Shaun of the Dead – Edgar Wright and Simon Pegg

Best Adapted ScreenplaySideways – Alexander Payne and Jim TaylorBefore Sunset – Richard Linklater, Julie Delpy and Ethan Hawke
Closer – Patrick Marber
Million Dollar Baby – Paul Haggis
The Motorcycle Diaries – José Rivera

Best Foreign Language FilmHero
House of Flying Daggers
Maria Full of Grace
The Motorcycle Diaries
A Very Long Engagement

Best Documentary
Fahrenheit 9/11
Control Room
Metallica: Some Kind of Monster
Super Size Me
Touching the Void

Best Animated Feature
The Incredibles
Ghost in the Shell 2: Innocence
The Polar Express
Shrek 2
Team America: World Police

Best Cinematography
Hero – Christopher DoyleThe Aviator – Robert Richardson
Collateral – Dion Beebe and Paul Cameron
Eternal Sunshine of the Spotless Mind – Ellen Kuras
House of Flying Daggers – Xiaoding Zhao

Best EditingEternal Sunshine of the Spotless Mind – Valdís ÓskarsdóttirThe Aviator – Thelma Schoonmaker
Hero – Angie Lam, Vincent Lee and Zhai Ru
House of Flying Daggers – Long Cheng
Kill Bill: Volume 2 – Sally Menke

Best ScoreThe Incredibles – Michael GiacchinoThe Aviator – Howard Shore
Birth – Alexandre Desplat
Eternal Sunshine of the Spotless Mind – Jon Brion
Hero – Tan Dun

Breakthrough FilmmakerZach Braff – Garden State
Kerry Conran – Sky Captain and the World of Tomorrow
Jared Hess – Napoleon Dynamite
Joshua Marston – Maria Full of Grace
Edgar Wright – Shaun of the Dead

Breakthrough Performer
Catalina Sandino Moreno – Maria Full of Grace
Zach Braff – Garden State
Jon Heder – Napoleon Dynamite
Bryce Dallas Howard – The Village
Emmy Rossum – The Phantom of the Opera

References 

2004
2004 film awards
21st-century film awards